Zubaida (or Zubaidah, Zubeida, Zubayda, Zubeda) is an Arabic (زُبَيْدَة), feminine given name that means "soft-bodied", "like cream", and is also an idiom for prime (in beauty, in virtue, grace), originating from the fact that cream is the prime part of the dessert, or the core of something that is growing. It is mostly used in Asia.

Notable people with this name include the following:

Given name
 Zubaidah bint Ja'far (766–831), the favourite wife of Harun al-Rashid
 Zübeyde Sultan (1728–1756), Ottoman princess, daughter of Sultan Ahmed III
 Zübeyde Hanım (1856–1923), mother of Turkish statesman Mustafa Kemal Atatürk
 Zubeida (1911–1988), Indian film actress
 Zubaida Yazdani (1916–1996), Indian historian
 Zubeida Agha (1922–1997), Pakistani artist
 Zubeida Begum (1926–1952), Indian film actress
 Zubaida Khanum (1935–2013), Pakistani playback singer
 Zubaida Tharwat (1940–2016), Egyptian actress
 Zubaida Gulshan Ara (c. 1943/44–2017), Bangladeshi writer 
 Zubaida Tariq (1945–2018), Pakistani chef
 Zubaida Jalal Khan (b. 1959), Pakistani politician
 Zübeyde Kaya (b. 1991), Turkish women's football defender
 Zübeyde Süpürgeci (b. 1993), Turkish Paralympian athlete
 Zubaida Bai, Malaysian expert in health products 
 Baby Zubeida, Indian child actress who acted in Awaara (1951)
 Zubeida Malik, British journalist
 Zubaida al-Meeki, Syrian colonel and dissident

Surname
Sami Zubaida (born 1937), American political scientist